John H. Guyer High School is a public high school situated in the city of Denton, Texas, in Denton County, United States and classified as a 6A school by the UIL.  It is a part of the Denton Independent School District located in central Denton County.   This was the third high school built by the district and was opened in 2005.  In 2013, the school was rated "Academically Acceptable" by the Texas Education Agency.

The school's namesake was a former principal at Denton High School who later served as assistant to the Denton ISD Superintendent. Initially, officials of Denton ISD expected Guyer to be slow to grow, but those thoughts were soon disproved by the flood of transfers from other high schools in the area to Guyer. This unexpected influx of students made it necessary to add twelve portable classrooms to the original school. Renovations were made to include a 10th through 12th grade wing and increased capacity of up to 3,200 students. They were finished by the start of the 2018–19 school year.

Its boundary includes sections of Denton, all of the census-designated place of Lantana, and sections of Bartonville, Copper Canyon, Corinth, Double Oak, and Flower Mound.

Athletics

State titles
Football:
2012(4A/D1), 2013(4A/D1)
Girls soccer:
2013(4A)

References

External links

Denton ISD

Denton Independent School District schools
Buildings and structures in Denton, Texas
2005 establishments in Texas
Educational institutions established in 2005
Denton Independent School District high schools